Fergus Reid Buckley (July 14, 1930 – April 14, 2014) was an American writer, speaker, and educator. Buckley was the founder of The Buckley School of Public Speaking. Among his books is a history of his family, An American Family—The Buckleys (2008).

Personal life
Buckley was born in Paris, France, where his father worked in the oil industry. In 1952, he graduated from Yale University, where he was a member of Skull and Bones. Buckley's older brothers were former New York Conservative United States Senator James L. Buckley, and conservative author and commentator William F. Buckley Jr., and his nephews are writer Christopher Buckley and Media Research Center founder L. Brent Bozell III. 

Buckley died of cancer at a hospice in Columbia, South Carolina in April 2014.

Works 
 Sex, Power and Pericles: Principles of Advanced Public Speaking.  Peor Es Nada  Press, 1997.
 Strictly Speaking: Reid Buckley’s Indispensable Handbook on Public Speaking. McGraw-Hill, 1999.
 USA Today: The Stunning Incoherence of American Civilization. P.E.N. Press, 2002.
 An American Family: The Buckleys. New York: Simon & Schuster, 2008.
 Speaking in Public: Buckley's Techniques for Winning Arguments and Getting Your Point Across. HarperCollins, 2010.

References

External links
 The Buckley School of Public Speaking

 Simon & Schuster's Author Page for Reid Buckley
 Western Kentucky University photographs of Reid Buckley
Obituary, by Jack Fowler, National Review
Obituary, by David Limbaugh, National Review
Legacy.com
Obituary, New York Times

2014 deaths
American male writers
Buckley family
1930 births
Yale University alumni
Writers from Paris
Deaths from cancer in South Carolina